DPDPE ([-2,-5]enkephalin) is a synthetic opioid peptide and a selective agonist of the δ-opioid receptor (DOR) which is used in scientific research. It was developed in the early 1980s and was the first highly selective agonist of the DOR to be developed. It was derived from structural modification of met-enkephalin.

See also
 DADLE
 DAMGO

References

Delta-opioid receptor agonists
Opioid peptides
Synthetic opioids